As a solo artist, South Korean singer Taemin has released four studio albums with one reissue, one compilation album, six extended plays (EPs), eighteen singles (including one as featured artist), one promotional single and six soundtrack appearances. Taemin's music career began in 2008 as a member of boy band Shinee.  In August 2014, he debuted as a solo artist by releasing his first extended play titled Ace, which topped the Gaon Album Chart, with lead single "Danger".

In February 2016, Taemin released his first studio album Press It which debuted in the top ten ranks of Billboards Heatseekers and World Albums charts. Its lead single "Press Your Number" debuted at number 79 on the Billboard Japan Hot 100, the first song by Taemin to appear on the chart. In July 2016, Taemin released his first Japanese EP Sayonara Hitori, ranking at number three on both the Oricon Albums Chart and Billboard Japan Hot Albums. In July 2017, Taemin's second Japanese EP Flame of Love debuted at number two on the Oricon Albums Chart and Billboard Japan Hot Albums, selling more than 51,000 copies in its first month of release. In October, he released his second studio album Move, with the title track selling over 120,000 digital downloads during its first week of release. He then released the reissue Move-ing with single "Day and Night" in December the same year.

His eponymous first Japanese studio album (and third overall), Taemin, was released in November 2018. The album spawned three singles: "Eclipse", "Mars", and "Under My Skin". It earned second place on the Oricon Albums Chart and Billboard Japan Hot Albums after selling more than 50,000 copies in its first day of release. In February 2019, Taemin released his second EP in Korean (fourth in total) titled Want. His third Japanese EP (fifth in total), Famous, was then released in August, selling over 41,000 copies on its first day of sales. In 2020, Taemin released his third Korean studio album Never Gonna Dance Again which was released in two parts. "2 Kids" was released as the lead single in August 2020, while "Criminal" and "Idea" served as the main single of Act 1 and Act 2, respectively. The two "acts" were later released together as an album repackage Never Gonna Dance Again (Extended Ver.) on December 14, 2020. All three versions of the album charted in the top ten ranks of the Gaon Album Chart and sold more than 300,000 copies in total. In May 2021, Taemin released his third EP in Korean (sixth in total) titled Advice, which was also his last release before military service.

Albums

Studio albums

Reissues

Compilation albums

Extended plays

Singles

As lead artist

As featured artist

Promotional singles

Soundtrack appearances

Other appearances

Other charted songs

Videography

Video albums

Music videos

Notes

References

External links 
  
  

discography
Discographies of South Korean artists
Pop music discographies